The Color Kittens is a children's book by Margaret Wise Brown, illustrated by Alice and Martin Provensen, and published, as part of the Little Golden Books series, in 1949.

Plot
The story revolves around two kittens, "Hush" and "Brush," who attempt to create green paint through mixing their other paints. Their attempts lead to a variety of different hues—none of them green. The book's famous catch phrase is "Blue is blue, and red is red! They still need green!"

Publication history
The Color Kittens, 1949, USA, Simon and Schuster 
The Colour Kittens, 1973, Australia, Golden Press 
The Color Kittens, (Kathi Ember, illustrator) 1994, USA, Western Publishing 
The Color Kittens, 2003, USA, Random House

Reception
Children's book author and illustrator Paul O. Zelinsky, for whom the book was a childhood favorite and inspiration, said that, "In a way, the book was written to teach facts about color, but its real subject is the huge pleasure to be found in the seeing and feeling of color [...]".  Suzanne Rahn notes that Hush and Brush's active creativity and exploration have some parallels among Brown's other cat characters, such as the drastically less-humanized Pussycat, who are much more passive in their representation of the creative state Brown called “Cat Life”.

References

External links
 http://bookweb.kinokuniya.co.jp/htmy/0307102343.html

1949 children's books
Children's fiction books
American picture books
Little Golden Books
Books by Margaret Wise Brown
Books about cats